Crocefieschi is a comune (municipality) in the Metropolitan City of Genoa in the Italian region Liguria, located about  northeast of Genoa.   
Crocefieschi borders the following municipalities: Busalla, Savignone, Valbrevenna, Vobbia.

References

See also
 Parco naturale regionale dell'Antola

Cities and towns in Liguria